The California Golden Bears women's basketball team is the women's college basketball team of the University of California, Berkeley.  The program has been to the NCAA tournament a total of nine times, and won three conference championships. The current head coach is Charmin Smith, who was hired on June 21, 2019.

The team plays its home games at Haas Pavilion, which was built on top of the old Harmon Gymnasium using money donated in part by the owners of Levi-Strauss. The arena was originally known as Men's Gymnasium and then later Harmon Gymnasium until the late 1990s when it went through massive renovations which displaced the team for two seasons.

History

Early history
The first intercollegiate women's basketball game was contested between intramural teams from California and Stanford in 1896, and intramural competition at California continued in following decades. However, it was not until 1973–74, following the enaction of Title IX, that California began playing officially organized women's basketball. Deborah Gebhardt served as the Golden Bears' inaugural coach.

After having four coaches in its first six seasons, the program entered a period of stability in 1979 with the arrival of Gooch Foster, who led the team to eight consecutive winning seasons to begin her tenure. Under Foster, California won consecutive conference titles in 1980–81 and 1981–82, and earned one AIAW and three NCAA tournament berths. Foster retired in the spring of 1996, after 17 seasons at the helm.

Center Colleen Galloway (1978–81) was the program's most notable player in its early days. She stood as the California women's all-time rebounding leader and the school's all-time scoring leader (men or women) until 2019. Galloway's number 13 was retired at the end of her collegiate career in 1981, the first Cal men's or women's player and to this day the only woman in program history to be so honored.

Joanne Boyle era (2005–2011)
Following 12 consecutive losing seasons from 1993–94 to 2004–05, California began a resurgence under former Richmond head coach Joanne Boyle. Boyle's first season ended in the Golden Bears' first NCAA Tournament appearance in fourteen years.

In 2006–07, California snapped Stanford's 50-game Pac-10 winning streak at Maples Pavilion en route to their first 20-win season since 1992 and a second consecutive NCAA tournament berth. The Golden Bears were ranked No. 25 in the final USA Today–ESPN women's basketball poll, and Joanne Boyle and Devannei Hampton received Pac-10 Coach and Player of the Year honors, respectively.

In 2007–08, California tied the 1983–84 Bears for the most wins in school history (24–4). The Bears were ranked as high as 8th in the national polls and set a then-Pac-10 women's basketball attendance record, with 10,525 witnessing Cal's 60–58 loss to Stanford at Haas Pavilion. The team won their first NCAA tournament game in a quarter-century before falling in the second round to George Washington.

The Golden Bears continued their uphill climb in 2008–09, with a team led by seniors Ashley Walker and Devanei Hampton. After beginning the season strongly and winning the Paradise Jam tournament in Saint Thomas, California carried their momentum into conference play. They reeled off 11 straight wins to open Pac-10 play—including their first home win over rival Stanford in 20 years—before slightly faltering down the stretch and finishing with a 15–3 conference record, tied for second. Despite a heartbreaking early exit from the Pac-10 Tournament at the hands of USC, the Bears went on a successful tournament run en route to their first ever Sweet 16 appearance. They led in the opening minutes against undefeated UConn Huskies but ultimately fell to the eventual national champions.

In 2009–10 the Bears brought in a top 10 recruiting class to make up for the losses of Walker and Hampton. The young Bears (the starting lineup during conference play featured four freshmen along with star senior Alexis Gray-Lawson) had an up and down year, going 6–5 in non-conference play including a home loss to nearby San Jose State. After an 0–3 conference start that left them two games under .500, the Bears started to find their form, going 12–5 the rest of the way including the Pac-10 tournament. However, the second half success was not enough for an NCAA tournament bid and Cal wound up settling for the WNIT. Although Alexis Gray-Lawson had to sit out the NIT opener because of an injury suffered in the Pac-10 tournament, the Bears edged UC Davis in overtime. Gray-Lawson returned for round 2, and the Bears romped through the remaining games against Utah, Oregon, BYU, Illinois State and finally Miami (FL) in the first ever championship game held at Haas Pavilion to win the tournament. Gray-Lawson ended her career as the all-time Cal leader in three points made and games played.

Boyle's final season in charge in Berkeley was 2010–11, which ended with a second-round loss in the WNIT to Colorado.

Lindsay Gottlieb era (2011–2019)
Following Boyle's departure for Virginia, California hired UC Santa Barbara's Lindsay Gottlieb to be the ninth coach in Golden Bears history. Keeping up where Boyle's teams left off, the 2011–12 Golden Bears returned to the NCAA tournament for the first time in three years, losing in the second round to eventual runners-up Notre Dame.

The 2012–2013 season started with high expectations, with almost the entire team returning from the season before, including star guard Layshia Clarendon. The Golden Bears were ranked #13 in the AP pre-season poll, their highest ranking since 2009. The team lived up to the expectations, finishing the regular season 28–2 and being ranked as high as No. 5. California's 17–1 Pac-12 record earned them their first share of a regular-season conference title since 1982. Despite a semifinal exit in the Pac-12 Tournament, the Golden Bears earned a second seed in the NCAA tournament. Following an overtime win over Georgia in the Elite Eight, California advanced to their first ever Final Four, where they lost to Louisville. The following summer, Layshia Clarendon was drafted ninth overall in the 2013 WNBA draft by the Indiana Fever.

Gottlieb continued to coach the Golden Bears through the 2018–19 season, leading players including top-10 WNBA picks Clarendon, Brittany Boyd, and Kristine Anigwe to a total of seven NCAA tournament appearances, the most of any head coach in program history. Under Gottlieb, Kristine Anigwe supplanted Colleen Galloway as California's all-time rebounding and scoring leader.

On June 12, 2019, Gottlieb was hired by the Cleveland Cavaliers as an assistant coach, becoming the first NCAA women's basketball coach to be hired by an NBA team. Gottlieb's 179 wins rank second all-time in team history.

Charmin Smith era (2019–present)
Gottlieb was succeeded as head coach by Charmin Smith, who had been on staff at California since 2007 and had served as Gottlieb's associate head coach since 2012.

Season-by-season results

 

 

 

 

|-style="background: #ffffdd;"
| colspan="8" align="center" | Pac-10/Pac-12

 

 

 

 

 

 

Source: 2011-12 Golden Bears Record Book and California Season Statistics

Postseason results

NCAA Division I

AIAW Division I
The Golden Bears made one appearance in the AIAW National Division I basketball tournament, with a combined record of 1–1.

Retired numbers

References

External links